Lawrence Edward "Larry" Barbiere (born March 6, 1951) is an American former competition swimmer and Olympic athlete.

Barbiere represented the United States as a 17-year-old at the 1968 Summer Olympics in Mexico City. He competed in the men's 100-meter backstroke, and finished fourth in the event final with a time of 1:01.1.

Barbiere attended Indiana University in Bloomington, Indiana, where he swam for coach Doc Counsilman's Indiana Hoosiers swimming and diving team in National Collegiate Athletic Association (NCAA) and Big Ten Conference competition from 1970 to 1973. He was an eleven-time All-American as a college swimmer, and was a key member of the Hoosiers' three consecutive NCAA national championship teams in 1971, 1972 and 1973.

Barbiere's son Jim also attended Indiana University and competed for the Hoosiers swim team from 2009 to 2013. His niece, swimmer Emily Silver, won a silver medal at the 2008 Olympics.

See also
 List of Indiana University (Bloomington) people

References

1951 births
Living people
American male backstroke swimmers
Indiana Hoosiers men's swimmers
Ohio lawyers
Olympic swimmers of the United States
Sportspeople from Dayton, Ohio
Swimmers at the 1968 Summer Olympics
University of Cincinnati College of Law alumni
20th-century American people
21st-century American people